Attila Bozsik is a Hungarian sprint canoer who has competed since 2008. He won two medals at the 2009 ICF Canoe Sprint World Championships in Dartmouth with a silver in the C-1 4 × 200 m and a bronze in the C-4 200 m.

References
Canoe09.ca profile

Hungarian male canoeists
Living people
Year of birth missing (living people)
ICF Canoe Sprint World Championships medalists in Canadian
21st-century Hungarian people